Germán Pablo Quintana Peña (born 1 May 1960) is a Chilean politician who served as minister of State and as intendant.

References

External links
 Profile at Annales de la República

1960 births
Living people
University of Chile alumni
Presidents of the University of Chile Student Federation
20th-century Chilean politicians
21st-century Chilean politicians
Christian Democratic Party (Chile) politicians